The Berkeley Version is an English translation of the Bible.  The New Testament was published by Zondervan in 1945 and an entire Bible was published in 1959.  A revised version was published as the New Berkeley Version or Modern Language Bible in 1969.

The stated aim of this version was to achieve plain, up-to-date expression which reflects as directly as possible the meaning of the Hebrew, Aramaic, and Greek. The New Testament was translated by Gerrit Verkuyl, who also supervised the translation of the Old Testament by a panel of twenty evangelical scholars.  The revision was undertaken following the death of Verkuyl, with a panel of three scholars revising the New Testament.  The revision was described as very extensive, but not a retranslation. Explanatory notes were revised as well as added. Topical headings were rephrased.

According to editor-in-chief Gerrit Verkuyl:  "The conviction that God wants His truth conveyed to His offspring in the language in which they think and live led me to produce the Berkeley Version (BV) of the New Testament. For I grew increasingly aware that the King James Version (AV) is only, in part, the language of our people."

References

Berkeley Version
Berkeley Version
Berkeley Version, The
Zondervan books
1945 in Christianity
1959 in Christianity
New Testament editions